The Dedicated Freight Corridor Corporation of India Limited (DFCCIL) is a public sector undertaking which undertakes planning, development, and mobilisation of financial resources and construction, maintenance and operation of the "Dedicated Freight Corridors" (DFC). The DFCCIL was registered as a company under the Companies Act 1956 in 2006.
First 2 DFCs, Western Dedicated Freight Corridor (WDFC), from Dadri in Uttar Pradesh to JNPT in Mumbai and Eastern Dedicated Freight Corridor (EDFC), Ludhiana in Punjab to Dankuni in West Bengal, which will decongest railway network by moving 70% of India's goods train to these two corridors, are both on track for completion by June 2022. 99% required land for these two have been acquired, and 56% of WDFC and 60% of EDFC is complete as of July 2020. There are new DFC approved/proposed in the national budget by Government of India such as East-West Dedicated Freight Corridor, North-South Dedicated Freight Corridor, East Coast Dedicated Freight Corridor and Southern Dedicated Freight Corridor.

It is both enabler and beneficiary of other key Government of India schemes, such as Industrial corridor, Make in India, Startup India, Standup India, Sagarmala, Bharatmala, UDAN-RCS, Digital India, BharatNet, Parvatmala.

Historical perspective
In April 2005, wherein, India and Japan announced collaboration for feasibility and possible funding of the dedicated rail freight corridors, and RITES was entrusted with the feasibility study of both eastern and western corridors, followed by formation of a Planning Commission's Task Force to prepare a concept paper on Delhi-Mumbai (Western) and Delhi-Howrah (Eastern) dedicated freight corridor projects, and to suggest a new organizational structure for planning, financing, construction and operation of these corridors.

In January 2006, RITES submitted the Feasibility Study Report of both the corridors and Cabinet approved Task Force's report, Cabinet Committee on Economic Affairs (CCEA) gave "in principle" approval to the Feasibility Study report. Subsequently, RITES submitted the PETS Report based on which the project was approved at a cost of ₹28,181 crore.

Dedicated Freight Corridors (DFC) 
Under the Eleventh Five Year Plan of India (2007–12), the Ministry of Railways started constructing a new Dedicated Freight Corridor (DFC) in two long routes, namely the Eastern and Western freight corridors. Upgrading of transportation technology, increase in productivity and reduction in unit transportation cost are the focus areas for the project.

DFCCIL has been designated by the Government of India as a Govt. of India(Ministry of Railways) Enterprise, and has been created to undertake planning & development, mobilisation of financial resources and construction, maintenance and operation of the Dedicated Freight Corridors. DFCCIL has been registered as a company under the Companies Act 1956 on 30 October 2006.

DFCCIL successfully conducted first inaugural run of Indian Railways freight train on 15th August 2018 between 190 Route km long New Ateli - New Phulera stations of WDFC.

Need for DFC
The Indian Railways have witnessed higher freight volumes without substantial investment in infrastructure, increased axle load, reduction of turn-around time of rolling stock, reduced unit cost of transportation, rationalization of tariffs resulting in improvement in market share and improved operational margins. Over the last 2 to 3 years, the railway freight traffic has grown by 8 to 11%, which is projected to cross 110 crore  tonnes by the end of 11th Five Year Plan.(Needs Updation)

Golden Quadrilateral Freight Corridor (GQFC) 

GQFC has 6 DFCs, 2 are being implemented and the funding for the remaining 4 was approved in January 2018. The rail tracks linking four largest metropolitan cities of Delhi, Mumbai, Chennai and Kolkata and two diagonals North-South Dedicated Freight Corridor (Delhi-Chennai) and East-West Dedicated Freight Corridor (Kolkata-Mumbai) are called the Golden Quadrilateral (GQFC). These carry 55% of the India Railway's freight traffic over a total  route length. The line capacity utilisation on the existing highly saturated shared trunk routes of Howrah-Delhi on the Eastern Corridor and Mumbai-Delhi on the Western Corridor varies between 115% to 150%.  The surging requirement for the power generation requiring heavy coal movement, booming infrastructure construction and growing international trade has led to the conception of the GQFCs. Carbon emission reduction from DFCs will help DFCCIL claim carbon credits.

Summary table of DFCs 
 

Green background for the systems that are under construction. Blue background for the systems that are currently in planning.

Conversion to high-speed corridors

Indian Railways plans to convert 10,000 km of passenger and freight trunk routes into high-speed rail corridors over 10 years with total investment of ₹20 lakh crore (US$320 billion in 2019) and an annual investment of ₹2 lakh crore (US$32 billion in 2019) from 2017 to 2027, where half of the money will be spent on converting existing routes into high-speed corridors by leapfrogging the technology and the rest will be used to develop the stations and electronic signaling at the cost of ₹60 thousand crore (US$8.4 billion in 2020) to enable automated running of trains at a frequency of 5–6 minutes. Freight corridors of 3,300 km length will also be completed, freeing the dual use high demand trunk routes for running more high-speed passenger trains.

Alternatively Indian Railways should use existing tracks to run Freight and passenger trains and should build 3rd, 4 lines for higher speeds or simply build tracks for semi high speed trains instead of DFC on High density routes.

This will be an optimal solution because new tracks with less curves, modern signalling, 40-50km average station spacing, capable of 160-240kmph operating speed and high gradient tracks will achieve

-> 120-150kmph average speed for express trains and..

-> 160-210kmph for Super Fast trains.

After shifting the express and super fast trains on to the new lines, the existing tracks can be used for both freight and medium distance local passenger train operations.

Because freight movement doesn't require speed like 160kmph, rather it needs Reliable Services. With supply chain optimization we can achieve that reliability.

Proposed projects
Rebuild overhead bridges to increase vertical and horizontal clearances.
Lengthening sidings/passing loops at every stations.
Remove high platforms and replaced with longer low platforms.

See also

 Dedicated freight corridors in India
 Eastern Dedicated Freight Corridor
 High-speed rail in India
 Indian Railways
 Mumbai–Ahmedabad high-speed rail corridor
 Rail transport in India
 Western Dedicated Freight Corridor

References

External links
 Dedicated Freight Corridor Corporation of India (DFCCIL) Official Website
 Dedicated Freight Corridor Corporation of India (DFCCIL) Official link for project status
 DFCC will use New Track Construction machine having capacity of 1.5 KM of track per day
 March 2014 news article stating near total land acquisition and environmental clearances

Use dmy dates from July 2020
Dedicated freight corridors of India
Railway companies of India
Government-owned companies of India
Proposed infrastructure in India
2006 establishments in Delhi
Indian companies established in 2006